Proholopterini is a tribe of beetles in the subfamily Cerambycinae, containing the following genera and species:

 Genus Neholopterus
 Neholopterus antarcticus Aurivillius, 1910
 Neholopterus ochraceus Bruch, 1918
 Neholopterus reedi Bruch, 1918
 Neholopterus richteri Bruch, 1918
 Genus Proholopterus
 Proholopterus annulicornis (Philippi & Philippi, 1859)
 Proholopterus chilensis (Blanchard in Gay, 1851)
 Proholopterus laevigatus (Philippi & Philippi, 1859)
 Genus Stenophantes
 Stenophantes herrerai Cerda, 1987
 Stenophantes longipes Burmeister, 1861
 Stenophantes martinezi Cerda, 1980
 Stenophantes patagonicus Bruch, 1918

References

Cerambycinae